The 1986 Southwest Conference baseball tournament was the league's annual postseason tournament used to determine the Southwest Conference's (SWC) automatic bid to the 1986 NCAA Division I baseball tournament. The tournament was held from May 16 through 19 at Olsen Field on the campus of Texas A&M University in College Station, Texas.

Due to rain delays, the loser's bracket and semifinal games were canceled. The winners of the first round games met in the finals.

The number 2 seed  went 3–0 to win the team's first SWC tournament under head coach Mark Johnson.

Format and seeding 
The tournament featured the top four finishers of the SWC's 8 teams in a double-elimination tournament.

Tournament

References 

Tournament
Southwest Conference Baseball Tournament
Southwest Conference baseball tournament